Silence Day or Day of Silence may refer to:

Day of Silence, a day in April designated to protest the bullying and harassment of lesbian, gay, bisexual, and transgender (LGBT) students 
Nyepi, a Balinese "Day of Silence" that is commemorated every Isakawarsa (Saka new year)
Silence Day, an annual July 10 observance of silence for adherents of Indian author and spiritual figure Meher Baba